The following X-STR markers are used in genealogical DNA testing and other forms of relationship testing.

See also 
Short Tandem Repeat
X-STR
List of Y-STR markers

DNA
Genetic genealogy
X-STR
Human evolution
Human population genetics